Gulam (circa 1860-1901) was an Indian practitioner of pehlwani. Gulam participated in early catch wrestling tournaments in Europe.  At 5 feet 9 inches and 280 pounds, Gulam wrestled in Paris in 1900 at the time of 1900 World's Fair.

In Paris, Gulam's manager extended a challenge to Turkish wrestler Kurtdereli Mehmet Pehlivan. Pandit Motilal Nehru was in attendance during the wrestling bout in Paris.

Edmond Desbonnet’s account of the bout was given in his 1910 book, Les Rois de la Lutte. According to this account, the newcomer dominated Kurtdereli. In order to avoid harming the financial interests of those who bet on Kurtdereli, the bets on the bout were called off. Gulam was proclaimed the winner, but all bets were reimbursed.
 
Gulam returned to India where, shortly after 1900, he died of cholera.

Desbonnet referred to Gulam as one of the two "super wrestlers" of modern times (the other being Yusuf İsmail) and Stanislaus Zbyszko told Robert W. Smith that, although he had never met Gulam himself, "I got information off one wrestler who did train with Gulam. He was the ruler of his day, of the mat, of human strength."

Gulam should not be confused with Ghulam "Great Gama" Muhammed, another pehlwani practitioner.

References

External links
The Lion of the Punjab– Gama in England, 1910 by Graham Noble
The Lion of the Punjab – Part IV: Aftermath by Graham Noble

Gandhi's Body: Sex, Diet, and the Politics of Nationalism by Joseph S. Alter

Indian male professional wrestlers
Karin Bux
Indian male martial artists
Year of birth uncertain
1901 deaths